Henry Frederick Baker FRS FRSE (3 July 1866 – 17 March 1956) was a British mathematician, working mainly in algebraic geometry, but also remembered for contributions to partial differential equations (related to what would become known as solitons), and Lie groups.

Early life

He was born in Cambridge the son of Henry Baker, a butler, and Sarah Ann Britham.

Education

He was educated at The Perse School before winning a scholarship to St John's College, Cambridge in October 1884. Baker graduated as Senior Wrangler in 1887, bracketed with 3 others.

Career
Baker was elected Fellow of St John's in 1888 where he remained for 68 years.

In June, 1898 he was elected a Fellow of the Royal Society. In 1911, he gave the presidential address to the London Mathematical Society.

Baker was one of the mathematicians (along with E. W. Hobson) to whom Srinivasa Ramanujan wrote before G. H. Hardy but his papers were returned without comment.

In January 1914 he was appointed Lowndean Professor of Astronomy.

Gordon Welchman recalled that in the 1930s before the war Dennis Babbage and he were members of a group of geometers known as Professor Baker's "Tea Party", who met once a week to discuss the areas of research in which we were all interested.

He married twice. Firstly in 1893 to Lilly Isabella Hamfield Klopp, who died in 1903, then he remarried in 1913, to Muriel Irene Woodyard.

He died in Cambridge and is buried at the Parish of the Ascension Burial Ground, with his second wife Muriel (1885 - 1956).

See also
Baker–Campbell–Hausdorff formula

Publications

 Abel's theorem and the allied theory, including the theory of the theta functions  (Cambridge: The University Press, 1897)
 An introduction to the theory of multiply periodic functions (Cambridge: The University Press, 1907)
 1943 An Introduction to Plane Geometry

References

1866 births
1956 deaths
19th-century British mathematicians
20th-century British mathematicians
Alumni of St John's College, Cambridge
Fellows of St John's College, Cambridge
Senior Wranglers
Fellows of the Royal Society
Lowndean Professors of Astronomy and Geometry
PDE theorists
De Morgan Medallists
People educated at The Perse School